Ignacio Verdura (22 November 1931 – 28 January 2018) was an Argentine equestrian. He competed in two events at the 1960 Summer Olympics.

References

External links
 

1931 births
2018 deaths
Argentine male equestrians
Olympic equestrians of Argentina
Equestrians at the 1960 Summer Olympics
People from Paraná, Entre Ríos
Sportspeople from Entre Ríos Province